Grigory Oyzerovich Spiegel (24 July 1914 — 28 April 1981) was a Soviet and Russian actor and voice actor. Honored Artist of the RSFSR (1974).

Biography
He worked as a pleater at a dye factory in Leningrad. He studied at the directing department of the Central School of amateur theater in Moscow.

In 1940 he graduated from an acting school at the Mosfilm. He worked as a National Film Actors' Theatre.

He took part in voicing cartoon characters, known for his voice being unusually high pitched and sonorous for a man.

Death
Died April 28, 1981. He was buried in Moscow at the Vvedenskoye Cemetery.

Selected filmography
 The Oppenheim Family (Семья Оппенгейм, 1939) as high-school student (uncredited)
 Taxi to Heaven (Воздушный извозчик, 1943) as Anany Svetlovidov
 Ballad of Siberia (Сказание о земле Сибирской, 1947) as Gregory Galaida
 The Young Guard (Молодая гвардия, 1948) as Fenbong
 Ivan Pavlov (Академик Иван Павлов, 1949) as Professor Petrushev
 Brave People (Смелые люди, 1950) as Schulze
 Zhukovsky (Жуковский, 1950) as passer with a lady
 Mussorgsky (Мусоргский, 1950) as von Metz
 Taras Shevchenko (Тарас Шевченко, 1951) as Karl Bryullov
 Children of the Partisan (Дети партизана, 1954) as spy photographer
 The Gadfly (Овод, 1955) as James Burton
 The Idiot (Идиот, 1958) as Ptitsyn
 On Distant Shores (На дальних берегах, 1958) as Schulz
 Michman Panin (Мичман Панин, 1960) as Father Teoctist
 Balzaminov's Marriage (Женитьба Бальзаминова, 1964) as policeman
 Tale About the Lost Time (Сказка о потерянном времени, 1964) as first aid doctor / apple buyer in a hat
 The Tale of Tsar Saltan (Сказка о царе Салтане, 1966) as governor
 The Seventh Companion (Седьмой спутник, 1967) as Shpigel
 The Diamond Arm (Бриллиантовая рука, 1968) as pharmacist-smuggler from Fish Street
 The Twelve Chairs (Двенадцать стульев, 1971) as Aleksandr Yakovlevich
 The Crown of the Russian Empire, or Once Again the Elusive Avengers (Корона Российской Империи, или Снова Неуловимые, 1971) as photographer
 Ilf and Petrov Rode a Tram (Ехали в трамвае Ильф и Петров, 1972) as employee of the newspaper
 Privalov's Millions (Приваловские миллионы, 1972) as Oscar Filippovich
 Northern Rhapsody (Северная рапсодия, 1974) as Gleb Petrovich Churilin
 The Twelve Chairs (Двенадцать стульев, 1976) as chief editor of newspaper "The Machine"
 Three Men in a Boat (Трое в лодке, не считая собаки, 1979) as grenadier
 The Luncheon on the Grass (Завтрак на траве, 1979) as episode
 Do Not Shoot at White Swans (Не стреляйте в белых лебедей, 1980) as passenger in the compartment
 Say a Word for the Poor Hussar (О бедном гусаре замолвите слово..., 1981) as prompter
 The Mystery of the Third Planet (Тайна третьей планеты, 1981) as Vesselchuck Oo (voice)
 Dog in Boots (Пёс в сапогах, 1981) as one-eyed cat-bully (voice)

References

External links
 
 Григорий Шпигель: одинокая жизнь популярного актёра

1914 births
Actors from Samara, Russia
1981 deaths
Soviet male film actors
Soviet male stage actors
Soviet male voice actors
Honored Artists of the RSFSR
Soviet Jews

Burials at Vvedenskoye Cemetery